Alejandro Baillères Gual (born May 1960) is a Mexican businessman, the CEO of Grupo Nacional Provincial, and the son of the billionaire Alberto Baillères.

Alejandro Baillères was born in May 1960. He has a degree from Stanford University.

He is a director of Peñoles and Grupo BAL, both owned by his father, and of Fresnillo plc. He is a director of various other companies.

References

1960 births
Living people
Mexican chief executives
Mexican people of French descent
Stanford University alumni
Alejandro